The Korea Jesus Presbyterian Church was a result in a split within the Presbyterian Church in Korea (Koshin). Kim Suk-Chan wanted to join the Presbyterian Church in Korea (HapDong) with his congregation the MunChan Church. Song San-Shuk respected his decision, but questioned his right to involve the whole congregation. Koshin was divided in this issue. Some felt that the church should not go to court, the General Assembly hesitated. One of the Presbytery suspended relations with the General assembly. This group organised  in 1960 a council, in 1967 they opened a high school and in 1969 the Covenant Seminary was formed. Finally in 1975 a new denomination was formed. In 1980 Presbyterian Church in Korea (KayShin) name was adopted. the Leading figure was Lee Byung-Gyu. The Apostles Creed and the Westminster Confession are the official standards. In 2004 it had 21,712 members in 135 congregations in 11 Presbyteries and a General assembly.

References 

Presbyterian denominations in South Korea
Christian organizations established in 1975